Youth America Grand Prix (YAGP) is the world's largest non-profit international student ballet competition and scholarship program, open to dance students of all nationalities, 9–19 years old. YAGP annually conducts regional auditions in the United States and around the world, with the Final Round of the competition held in New York City every April.

Overview
The mission of YAGP is to ensure the future of dance by providing scholarships to the world's leading dance institutions and creating other educational and professional opportunities for young dancers, acting as a stepping stone to a professional dance career.

Each year, over 10,000 dancers participate in the competitions and auditions YAGP conducts in more than 25 locations in North America and international locations including Argentina, Australia, Belgium, Brazil, Canada, China, France, Italy, Japan, Korea, Mexico, Paraguay.

Approximately 1,200 students are hand-selected each year by the YAGP panel of judges to proceed to the Finals in New York City, where they are seen by the directors and representatives of the world's leading dance academies. More than $500,000 in scholarships is awarded annually to these dance institutions.

To provide increased opportunity to the growing number of participants at regional semi-finals, and to make sure that each event is a stand-alone educational experience, since 2012 YAGP has begun offering scholarships at the regional semi-final level.

In 20 years since YAGP's founding, over 100,000 dancers have participated in YAGP events around the world. By January 2017, more than $3 million has been awarded to young dancers in scholarships to the world's leading dance academies, and more than 350 alumni are now dancing with 80 companies around the world.

YAGP offers dance students the unique opportunity to be seen, taught and professionally guided by the directors and leading faculty of the world's foremost companies and schools, including: ABT/JKO School), The Australian Ballet School, The Houston Ballet Academy, The Joffrey Ballet School, The John Cranko School of Stuttgart Ballet, Paris Opera Ballet School, Les Ballets de Monte Carlo, The San Francisco Ballet School, among many others.

Many YAGP Alumni go on to have professional careers in dance, joining world-renowned dance companies including American Ballet Theatre, Australian Ballet, Dutch National Ballet, Houston Ballet, Joffrey Ballet, Mariinsky Theatre, National Ballet of Canada, New York City Ballet, Paris Opera Ballet, Royal Ballet, Stuttgart Ballet, among many others.

Some of YAGP's most successful alumni include Maria Abashova, Isabella Boylston, Cesar Corrales, Michaela DePrince, Sasha De Sola, Matthew Golding, Melissa Hamilton, Sarah Lane, Lauren Lovette, Brooklyn Mack, Sara Mearns, Sergei Polunin, Hee Seo, and Cory Stearns among many others.  - see also § Notable YAGP Alumni (below).

History
While pursuing her teaching career in the United States, Larissa Saveliev wanted to showcase the progress of her students and learn from other teachers in the area. She was hoping to find a ballet version of the jazz dance competitions that were very popular at the time, yet there were no ballet competitions for students in the U.S. In 1999, together with her husband Gennadi Saveliev (then a soloist with American Ballet Theatre) she decided to create one – and founded Youth America Grand Prix.

YAGP was created and developed with the active involvement of Sergey Gordeev, who became YAGP's Founding Director of External Affairs, Shelley King, who led the team as Operations Director, giving over 12 years to the organization, Barbara Brandt, who served as YAGP's first Chair of the Board of Directors, and continues to stay actively involved as a board member and Chair Emeritus, Judith M. Hoffmann, who joined as one of the first members of the Board of Directors, and Linda Morse, who serves as the current and longest-running Chair of the Board of Directors.

YAGP was officially launched in 1999 with competitions and classes held in Boston, Washington, DC., Chicago, Los Angeles and Boca Raton. 8 American schools presented scholarships in the first year of YAGP's existence.

The competition quickly became the largest in the United States, and is internationally recognized. Royal Ballet School was the first international scholarship presenter.

YAGP was the first competition to introduce the concept that a student does not have to win 1st, 2nd or 3rd place to receive the prize (scholarship). Scholarships at YAGP are awarded based on each individual school director's evaluation of a student's potential, independently of the panel of judges’ decision. This concept has now been widely adopted by many other ballet competitions around the world.

In 2005, the United Nations Educational, Scientific and Cultural Organization (UNESCO) recognized YAGP's contribution to international dance education by awarding it with a membership in UNESCO's prestigious Conseil International de la Danse (CID).

In 2007 Youth America Grand Prix became the first organization in the 50-year history of Italy's prestigious Spoleto Dance Festival to present performances by dance students.

In 2009, YAGP broke the existing Guinness World Record for “Most ballet dancers en pointe” with 221 dancers from 27 countries.

In 2010 YAGP introduced the YAGP Job Fair, a special audition series giving YAGP participants and alumni a chance to be seen and hired by the directors of the world's leading dance companies.

In 2014 YAGP launched a new dance education initiative: “Dance in Higher Education” - a program that gives dance students and their parents an opportunity to meet with representatives of the country's leading college and university-based dance programs and learn about options in combining academic education with dance training.

YAGP is a member of the International Federation of Ballet Competitions (IFBC) and is a partner competition to Moscow International Ballet Competition, Prix de Lausanne, Varna International Ballet Competition, and USA International Ballet Competition.

Competition
YAGP participants are divided into three age categories: Senior Age Category (15–19 years old), Junior Age Category (12–14 years old), and Pre-Competitive Age Category (9–11 years old).

In addition to scholarships, YAGP grants other awards to the most talented participants, such as Dance Europe Award.  The most outstanding dancer in the Senior category receives the Grand Prix. An exceptional dancer in the Junior category receives a Youth Grand Prix, and a dancer who shows the most potential in the Pre-Competitive category receives the Hope Award. First, Second, and Third Places are awarded to Men and Women in the Senior, Junior and Pre-Competitive category of soloists. First, Second and Third places are awarded in the Ensembles categories, for large ensembles and for Pas de Deux.

To develop respect for artistry among its students, YAGP holds classes and workshops at every competition that are taught by the panel of judges.

Scholarship awards 
Each year, more than $500,000 is awarded at YAGP in scholarships to the world's leading dance academies. While some institutions are represented every year, others present scholarships on a rotating basis. The YAGP panel of judges represents schools that issue scholarships to participants.

Critical reception 

 "Youth America Grand Prix has grown to become the largest and one of the most influential youth ballet competitions in the world" and has become “a game changer in the dance world. Almost overnight, Youth America Grand Prix created a central ballet marketplace.” – Laura Bleiberg,  The Los Angeles Times.
 “Thrilling, tense, sometimes heart wrenching journey is called the Youth America Grand Prix, the elite of the elite….. ” - Cynthia McFadden, ABC Nightline
 “Youth America Grand Prix is a sort of Olympics of classical ballet…” - Hedy Wess, Chicago Sun Times
 “The Youth America Grand Prix, a genuine, internationally recognized event where ballet hopefuls can win trophies, scholarships and contracts” - Lewis Segal, The Los Angeles Times
 “The explosive growth and prominence that YAGP… accomplished in its 15 years is at least remarkable.” - Jerry Hochman, “Critical Dance”
 “No question—Larissa and Gennadi Saveliev, who founded the competition, have made YAGP what it is today—the most exciting platform for young dancers in the world.” - Dance Europe 
 “If you want to see the future now, attend the annual Youth America Grand Prix ballet competition in New York.” - Elena Tchernichova, Ballet Review
 “In the world of amateur ballet, Youth America Grand Prix…  is a potentially life-changing affair.” - Jennifer Van Grove, The Sun Diego Union Tribune
 “This ballet competition changes lives” - Jordan G. Teicher, Slate Magazine
 “The Youth America Grand Prix has achieved an impressive world-wide status.” - Susan Reiter, Dance Australia
 “The educational opportunities that competitions such as YAGP provide, help preserve [the art form] and open it to an ever-widening range of performers and enthusiasts.” - Jerry Hochman, “Critical Dance”
 “[YAGP] is essentially the “American Idol” of ballet.” - Jennifer Van Grove, The Sun Diego Union Tribune
 “Founded 19 years ago by Larissa and Gennadi Saveliev.., no one ... could have dreamed the prestigious, worldwide phenomenon that [YAGP] has become.” - Jerry Hochman, Critical Dance
 “For dancers, the Youth America Grand Prix is the equivalent of an NFL draft, but more graceful.”- Wayne Freedman, ABC news

Programs and initiatives

Galas

YAGP Gala “Stars of Today Meet the Stars of Tomorrow” 
As part of its mission to educate the next generations of dancers and audiences, YAGP uses its New York City  “Stars of Today Meet the Stars of Tomorrow” Gala as a venue to introduce exciting new talent to New York audiences and the young YAGP participants from around the world. Many dancers who are now considered the world's most exciting and prominent ballet stars have made their New York debut at YAGP's “Stars of Today Meet the Stars of Tomorrow” Gala. They have included Polina Semionova (Berlin State Ballet); Denis and Anastasia Matvienko, Yevgenia Obraztsova, and Ivan Vasiliev (Bolshoi Ballet); Friedemann Vogel (Stuttgart Ballet); Daniel Camargo, Sasha Mukhamedov and Edo Wijnen (Dutch National Ballet); Yonah Acosta (English National Ballet); Hugo Marchand and Hannah O’Neill (Paris Opera Ballet); Melissa Hamilton and Cesar Corrales (The Royal Ballet); Cecilia Kerche and Vitor Luiz (Theatro Municipal (Rio de Janeiro)) & Evan McKie representing both (The National Ballet of Canada) & the (Stuttgart Ballet).

In keeping with its educational mission, YAGP has also used its New York City Gala as an opportunity to present a number of dancers' farewell performances in New York, in order to give young dancers, a chance to experience extraordinary artistry in a live performance. As part of its innovative programming, the YAGP Galas have included the New York farewell performances of such internationally known ballet stars as Paris Opera Ballet's Etoile dancer Manuel Legris, Bolshoi Ballet’s Nikolai Tsiskaridze, and The Royal Ballet's Darcey Bussell.

The program of the Gala ranges from the well-known ballet classics to cutting-edge contemporary choreography. In an effort to provide opportunities not only to talented young dancers but also to young choreographers, YAGP launched the Emerging Choreographer Series. As part of this annual series, YAGP has created a powerful platform for up-and-coming choreographers to present their work to the international dance community. The Emerging Choreographer Series has presented works by Camille A. Brown, Marcelo Gomes, Adam Hougland, Emery LeCrone, Gemma Bond, Susan Jaffe, Evan McKie (with Olga Smirnova) and Justin Peck – many of them debuting with World Premieres.

YAGP Galas have also presented World Premieres by such established choreographers as Camille A. Brown, Derek Hough, Benjamin Millepied and Carlos dos Santos, Jr.

Critical reception 
The YAGP Gala is “the highlight of the season!” – Clive Barnes, NY Post

The YAGP Gala performers are “a truly impressive parade of artists.” - Jocelyn Noveck, The Moscow Times (AP)

“The evening was full of high spirits - Jocelyn Noveck, The Moscow Times (AP)

“.... the bows naturally brought the audience to its feet” – Brian Seibert, The New York Times

“We were already cheering at the top of our lungs during the standing ovation, when Kevin McKenzie gestured to Marcelo Gomes and David Hallberg to lift her up high. Then we really went crazy”” Wendy Perron, Dance Magazine

“The sheer number of ballet greats inside … was enough to leave me completely star struck.” – Rachel Zar, Dance Spirit

“There was artistry in abundance of today's most celebrated ballerinas from around the globe … The men were the world's best as well. The sold-out house was filled with grown-ups who knew how to appreciate what they were watching” – Sondra Forsyth, Dance Art

“The Makarova gala crowned three, remarkable evenings of performances by international artists and by Youth America Grand Prix hopefuls.” – Robert Johnson, The Star-Ledger

How Judges Judge 
In 2011, YAGP was featured as part of the Guggenheim Museum’s “Works & Process” series, which explores artistic creation through conversation and performance in the Guggenheim's Peter B. Lewis Theater.

The YAGP educational presentation, “How Judges Judge,” gave its audience information on professional evaluation of dance artists by the YAGP judges – which included Gailene Stock, then Director of the Royal Ballet School; Franco de Vita, then Director of the ABT/JKO School; and Adam Sklute, Artistic Director of Ballet West. Hosted by TV journalist Sergey Gordeev, the program featured several YAGP participants in an impromptu ballet competition on stage, as the judges provided feedback for each performance and explained the reasons behind their evaluation.

“How Judges Judge” was streamed live online and, at the time, became the most-watched event in “Works and Process” history.

First Position film 
In 2011, YAGP was featured in First Position, an award-winning documentary directed by Bess Kargman. The film followed six young YAGP participants – Michaela DePrince, Aran Bell, Gaya Bommer-Yemini, Miko Fogarty, Jules Fogarty, Joan Sebastian Zamora, and Rebecca Houseknecht – on their journey to YAGP's New York City Finals.

First Position received its World Premiere at the 36th Annual Toronto International Film Festival on September 11, 2011. It won high critical acclaim and several awards at major U.S. film festivals before it was released in theaters in the United States on May 4, 2012.

Dance School Diaries 
In 2014, YAGP became the subject of Dance School Diaries, a reality web TV series featuring four YAGP participants – Lex Ishimoto, Madison Chappel, Andrea Guite, and Sage Humphries – as they fight for their dream of becoming professional dancers. “Dance School Diaries” aired on DanceOn, an internet platform with an audience of over 100 million viewers. It was co-produced by Nigel Lythgoe, creator of “American Idol” and “So You Think You Can Dance,” Kevin Brown, Alex Reznik, and Lawrence Bender. The series was viewed around the world received wide popular acclaim.

Dance and Fashion Exhibit at the FIT 
In 2014, YAGP became a part of fashion history through the “Dance & Fashion” exhibit at the Museum of the Fashion Institute of Technology. Organized by the Museum director Valerie Steele, this unprecedented exhibition explored the synergy between dance and fashion, driven by inspiration and collaboration.

As part of the exhibit, pre-eminent U.S. fashion designer Ralph Rucci created special costumes for YAGP Alum Calvin Royal III (currently principal dancer at American Ballet Theatre), who performed a specially commissioned piece, choreographed by Gemma Bond to the original music by Karen LeFrak.

The exhibit moves from the 19th century all the way to the present and highlights how many designers and their creations have been inspired by dance over time. Moreover, it emphasizes how each apparel design may fit a specific story, emotion, overall dance portrayal (etc), and its importance when creating new styles for dance.

References

External links
YAGP 2015 Winners
YAGP 2014 Winners
YAGP 2013 Winners
YAGP 2012 Winners
Alumni Success Stories

School dance competitions
Ballet competitions
Dance in New York City
1999 establishments in the United States